Blackpool Pleasure Beach is an amusement park situated on Blackpool's South Shore, in the county of Lancashire, North West England. The park was founded in 1896 by A. W. G. Bean and his partner John Outhwaite. The current managing director is Amanda Thompson.

The park is host to many records, including the largest collection  of wooden roller coasters of any park in the United Kingdom with four: the Big Dipper, Blue Flyer, Grand National and Nickelodeon Streak. Many of the roller coasters in the park are record-breaking attractions. When it opened in 1994, The Big One was the tallest roller coaster in the world. It was also the steepest, with an incline angle of 65° and the second fastest with a top speed of 74 miles per hour (119 km/h).

The park was the first in Europe to introduce a fully inverting steel coaster, Revolution and is the last remaining park in the world to still operate a Steeplechase roller coaster. The Grand National is one of only three Möbius loop coasters in existence, where a singular track "loops" around itself, offering a facsimile out-and-back layout and creating a "racing" effect on two parallel tracks. Sir Hiram Maxims Captive Flying Machine is the oldest amusement park ride in Europe having opened in August 1904. At the cost of £15 million, Valhalla was one of the largest and most expensive indoor dark rides in the world. Designed by Sarner and manufactured by Intamin, Valhalla won "Best Water Ride" at the 2018 Golden Ticket awards, an accolade it has held over a consecutive number of years. The park also operates a Nickelodeon Land and the world's only Wallace & Gromit ride, the Thrill-O-Matic. In 2015 the park introduced Red Arrows Sky Force, a Gerstlauer Sky Fly thrill ride which is the first ride of its kind in the United Kingdom. The latest record is taken by Icon, a multi-launch coaster manufactured by Mack Rides in Germany.

History of the Pleasure Beach

Early years (1896–1930)

Pleasure Beach was founded in 1896 by Alderman William George Bean after he failed in his attempt to become an advertising man on New York's Madison Avenue. He returned to the United Kingdom in 1897 and opened two separate amusement parks; one adjacent to Euston Road in Great Yarmouth and another in Blackpool, opposite the tram terminus. The Great Yarmouth amusement park failed to generate much interest and so Bean moved to Blackpool full-time towards the end of the century.

In 1903, Bean, along with local businessman John Outhwaite, purchased 30 acres of land known as the "Watson Estate" which was used to expand the amusement park in Blackpool. The original Pleasure Beach was built on the sand dunes along the promenade and consisted of a few roundabouts, a Bicycle Railway and several Gypsy stalls. Bean and Outhwaite decided to grow the business after visiting Coney Island in the United States. Using a small static fairground in London's Earls Court for inspiration, Bean added more rides and sideshows to the Pleasure Beach which began to garner the attention of holidaymakers. Bean's aim was to establish a fun park of a relative size that would "make adults feel like children again and inspire gaiety of a primarily innocent character."

The first notable attraction of interest to open at Pleasure Beach was Sir Hiram Maxim's Captive Flying Machine, a rotary swing ride designed by the British inventor of the same name in 1904. A Mill Chute water ride followed in 1905, which opened under the name The River Caves of the World. Both of these rides are still operational today. In 1907 the park opened its first wooden roller coaster, which was known as The Scenic Railway. It was during this time that the park began to trade under the name Blackpool Pleasure Beach. In 1909, Bean expanded the Pleasure Beach business by purchasing a second amusement park up the coast in Morecambe under the name West End Amusement Park, which would later become Frontierland, Morecambe. The success of the Morecambe park led to a third amusement park opening four years later in Southport under the name Pleasureland Southport.

Meanwhile, the Pleasure Beach was developed with frequent large scale investments, including The Velvet Coaster, the House of Nonsense, The Joy Wheel and The Whip. Outhwaite died in 1911, leaving most of the remaining business to Bean; however, the Outhwaite family still obtained shares in the park and would occasionally have input into its growth. Following the First World War investment at the park ceased due to the difficulty in exporting rides from the United States and the next investments would not be until 1922 when The Virginia Reel and Noah's Ark opened. Despite the lack of investment, profits at the Pleasure Beach soared, and the company was noted as being one of the most prolific employers in the north-west of England.

Further into the 1920s, Bean invested in the Casino Building, a triple-tiered Art-Deco building designed by local architect and then Blackpool Mayor Alderman Robert Butcher Mather (1852–1933), JP. The exterior of the building featured a white ferroconcrete façade with white electric lighting, and the interior housed a billiard hall, cinema, restaurant and gift shop. Today the Casino Building features a number of function rooms and offices, and the ground floor space is used as the main ticket centre.

In 1923, land was reclaimed from the Blackpool seafront, and it was during this period that the Pleasure Beach moved to its  current location along the promenade. The same year Bean brought in John Miller to design and build the Big Dipper, an out-and-back wooden coaster and shortly afterwards a boating pool was built for boat rides. This was Bean's final investment before he died of pneumonia in 1929, having spent 33 years shaping and developing what would become one of the most significant amusement parks in the world. Following his death, his only daughter Lillian-Doris inherited the Pleasure Beach business.

Lillian-Doris Bean married Leonard Thompson, an Oxford Natural Sciences graduate and businessman in 1928. The Thompsons lived in London where Leonard worked at a Swedish Match Company. However, after Bean's death, the couple returned to Blackpool, where decisions regarding the future running of the Pleasure Beach were in discussion. Leonard up until that point had not had any active involvement with the Pleasure Beach whatsoever, however on a mutual agreement with his wife, it was agreed that Thompson would take over the running of the Pleasure Beach and have full responsibility for all its affairs. His first move was to appoint Oscar Haworth as the General Manager and George Palmer as chairman of the company. Over the next two years, Thompson worked with the Outhwaites to expand the business further, starting with the construction of The Ghost Train which opened in 1930.

Golden years (1931–2004)

In 1931 the remaining Outhwaite family sold their share of the park to the Thompsons, who now had complete control and ownership of the business. The following year Watson Road was built alongside the park, which resulted in the closure of the Velvet Coaster. Thompson's next major investment was the construction of the Fun House in 1934 and The Grand National, a Möbius loop wooden coaster built by celebrated coaster designer Charles Paige in 1935. Paige had designed numerous other rides at the Pleasure Beach, including the Rollercoaster, another wooden coaster that was constructed on the site of The Velvet Coaster in 1933.

The success of Paiges' wooden coasters resulted in a complete reprofiling of the Big Dipper in 1936, which was extended towards the south-westerly side of the park. During this time Thompson hired Joseph Emberton, an award-winning architect who was brought in to redesign the architectural style of the Pleasure Beach rides and buildings. He worked on The Casino Building, Noah's Ark and the Ice Drome, a 2,000-seat ice rink. Emberton continued to design for the Pleasure Beach up to his death in 1956. After which Jack Ratcliffe, who had been involved in the Festival of Britain, was brought in to continue the work. Ratcliffe worked for many years at the park, and much of his work can still be seen today.

Investments steadily decreased during the Second World War; however, the park remained open throughout the year to offer solace to the British public. The park returned to prominence between 1958 and 1961 when The Wild Mouse, Derby Racer and Alice In Wonderland opened and over the next few years the scale of investments increased, with the world's longest Log Flume opening in 1967 and The Goldmine opening four years later. The Walt Disney Company visited the park earlier in the decade, and Pleasure Beach was one of a few parks which became the basis for the first Disneyland Park in Anaheim, California. Walt Disney formed a friendship with Thompson, and the two would regularly inspire one another when developing their respective parks. After many successful years as the managing director of the Pleasure Beach, Leonard Thompson died in 1976, having run the business for 47 years. Following Thompson's death, Doris Thompson was appointed chairman of the business. Their only son, Geoffrey Thompson inherited his father's role and became the new managing director.

William "Geoffrey" Thompson was born in Manchester in 1936. He spent most of his early working life administering the New Era Laundries in London before returning to the family business as head of catering at the Casino Building. He married his wife, Barbara Thompson (née Foxcroft) in 1962 and shortly afterwards they had three children: Amanda, Nicholas and Fiona. Geoffrey invested millions of pounds developing the business, carrying forward his father's legacy, which was for the Pleasure Beach to always be at the forefront of global amusement parks. He hired Keith Ingham to make extensive alterations to the Casino Building which was re-launched as the Wonderful World Building (since then the building has reverted to its original name of the 'Casino'). Thompson's reign saw the opening of the Steeplechase, Avalanche, Revolution and Ice Blast. His most notable investments include The Big One which opened in 1994 and was the tallest and fastest roller coaster in the world at the time, and Valhalla which opened in 2000.

Geoffrey was actively involved in promoting tourism in the North West of England. He sat on almost all the relevant agencies, including the English Tourist Board and the British Association of Leisure Parks, Piers and Attractions, and was awarded the Order of the British Empire status along with his mother for their contribution to tourism. In 1986, Blackpool Pleasure Beach Limited became one of the first companies in the United Kingdom to register with the Government Profit Related Pay Unit. Under this scheme, the company agreed that, where profits exceeded £1 million, 10 per cent would be distributed among the permanent staff according to their length of service.

Despite his reputation as a leading businessman in the industry, Thompson often found himself in dispute with Blackpool Council over their decision to allow private traders to operate on land opposite the Pleasure Beach. He also clashed with Morecambe Town Council, who would regularly oppose and disrupt his plans to develop the Morecambe amusement park. As a result of his frustration and due to declining attendance, Thompson closed Frontierland in 2000, which had operated for 91years. Many of the rides were either destroyed, sold or relocated to Thompson's other parks. Further investments followed at the Pleasure Beach, including Spin Doctor in 2002, the Big Blue Hotel in 2003 and Bling, the following year. Geoffrey Thompson died of a heart attack at Blackpool Pleasure Beach on 12 June 2004 while attending a party to celebrate his daughter's wedding. Doris Thompson, MBE OBE died nine days later, on 23 June, the date of her son's funeral.

Later years (2004–Present)

Amanda Thompson, Geoffrey's eldest daughter and a director of the park for over 15years, took over the whole Pleasure Beach business. Nicholas Thompson became the deputy managing director and Fiona Giljé (née Thompson), a fundamental architect, became a senior company director. Amanda had previously risen to prominence as the founder and president of Stageworks Worldwide Productions, which produced numerous stage shows at both the Pleasure Beach and international venues. Like her father and grandmother, Amanda was appointed an OBE for her contribution to tourism. During Amanda's reign, the park has seen vast redevelopment, including a re-branding exercise, as well as the removal of numerous rides including The Whip, Space Invader 2, Turtle Chase, Spin Doctor, Trauma Towers, Noah's Ark, Black Hole, Bling, Wild Mouse and Superbowl. In 2006, the family decided to close Pleasureland Southport which, despite extensive investment and development, had not turned a profit for several years. This move coincided with the closure of Pleasure Beach's Log Flume, Drench Falls and resulted in the introduction of Infusion, the park's first new roller coaster in 13years. Infusion was relocated from Pleasureland, where it had operated under the name of Traumatizer since 1999, and was built on the site of the Log Flume.

In 2011, the Thompson family signed a contract with Viacom, owners of the American-based Nickelodeon brand to open Nickelodeon Land, a 4-acre area situated within the main park. Nickelodeon Land was a £10 million redevelopment of the parks' previous children's area Beaver Creek which closed in 2010. Notable changes include a complete retheme of the Rollercoaster which reopened under the new alias Nickelodeon Streak and the use of the formerly defunct Space Invader 2 building which is now occupied by a pizza restaurant. Many of the other rides were either replaced or repainted and renamed to represent the Nickelodeon brand.

In 2013, the park worked alongside Aardman Animations, owners of the Wallace & Gromit and Shaun the Sheep brands, to introduce Wallace & Gromit's Thrill-O-Matic, a dark ride which replaced the Gold Mine. Two years later, in 2015, the park teamed up with the RAF to open the Red Arrows Skyforce a thrill ride based on the famous air acrobatic team.

In 2018 the park opened Icon, a £16.25 million multi-launched coaster built by Mack Rides of Germany and the first roller coaster to be built at the park in over a decade. In 2019 a second hotel Boulevard Hotel was built on the site of the former Star Pub. The hotel features 120 en-suite rooms, two restaurants and ten suites.

Managing directors

Current park

It is bordered by the Promenade, Balmoral Road, Bond Street, Burlington Road West and Clifton Drive, and is situated above Watson Road, which is underneath the grounds and runs under a tunnel bridge in the centre of the park. Guests enter the park by passing under giant metal arches which are illuminated in the evening. The main Ticket Centre can be found on the ground floor of the Casino Building which is situated to the north of the park, along with a large Gift Shop. The rest of the ground floor space is taken up by a show bar named The Horseshoe and a large Café named W.G Beans. The second tier of the building, known as the penthouse floor is home to a function suite named The Paradise Room and The White Tower Restaurant, a luxury restaurant overlooking the promenade. Above The Paradise Room is a second Moroccan-themed function room named The Attic. The basement area of the building is taken up by another licensed bar named The Horror Bar and an interactive horror maze named Pasaje del Terror.

Outside The Casino building towards the left of the main entrance is a second theatre named The Globe. The main park can be accessed via a number of turnstiles, each staffed by a security ambassador at the north entrance. A separate entrance towards the south end of the park is available for hotel residents only, and a third entrance is situated towards the east side of the park via The Arena. The park is heavily secured by metal gates; however, these gates are occasionally opened to permit large groups of guests into the park during the peak season. The park has five car parks and a coach park. Blackpool Pleasure Beach railway station, the Big Blue Hotel and the Boulevard Hotel are situated towards the south end of the park.

The park is split up into three sections: North Park, Nickelodeon Land and South Park. The main park is divided by separate themed areas. These are North Entrance Plaza, Heidi Strasse, Bean Street FY4, The Watson Overpass and South Entrance Plaza. Many of the rides in the park are built over or under other attractions and buildings, making the Pleasure Beach the most densely populated amusement park in terms of ride space in the world.

These regulations include the placing of red and white lights at the top of structures and warning signals and beacons to alert airline traffic.

Rides
 – Rides located in Nickelodeon Land.

Rollercoasters

Thrill Rides

Water Rides

Family Rides

Other Rides

Past Rides

Entertainment

Hot Ice
A seasonal show performed at The Arena (previously the Ice Drome). The show has been running since 1936 and is produced by Amanda Thompson and choreographed by Oula Jaaskelainen.

Ken Webster: Mentalist Hypnotist
A seasonal adult comedy hypnotism show performed by veteran hypnotist Ken Webster.

Evolution of Magic
A Las Vegas-style magic and illusion show performed by award-winning magicians Craig Christian and Elizabeth Best. Performed seasonally in The Horseshoe.

Spectacular Dancing Water Show
A £500,000 half an hourly musical water show designed by Aquatique Show International. It features thirty individual jets synchronized to move to different styles of music, and a water cannon capable of shooting water up to 100 feet into the air.

Other attractions

Adventure Golf
A 12-hole course situated on the former Flagstaff Gardens on the promenade. Opened in 2008.

Ripley's Believe It Or Not!
A museum of oddities built across two floors and based on Ripley's Believe It Or Not. Situated along Ocean Boulevard.

Pasaje Del Terror
Interactive horror maze, situated towards the north end of Ocean Boulevard, adjacent to the entrance to Pleasure Beach. Opened in June 1998.

The Arena
A large ice rink situated towards the east of the park. Home to Hot Ice and open year-round.

Accommodation

Big Blue Hotel
A family hotel "The Big Blue Hotel" with a four-star AA rating, situated adjacent to Blackpool Pleasure Beach railway station towards the south end of Ocean Boulevard opened in Spring 2003.

Boulevard Hotel
In 2019 a second hotel, the Boulevard Hotel, was built on the site of the former Star pub. The hotel features 120 rooms and 10 suites and is the second four-star hotel to be operated by the company.

Recent accolades
Here are a selection of the awards and nominations received over the last decade:
 2013: Best Attraction for Groups – Lancashire Tourism Awards
 2014: Best Large Tourist Attraction – North West In Bloom
 2014: The Arena - Favourite Rink – LAMBCO
 2014, 2016: Second-best Seaside Park – Golden Ticket Awards
 2014: Best Theme Park in the United Kingdom; 9th Best Theme Park in Europe – Travellers' Choice Awards
 2014: Big Blue Hotel – Third-best hotel in the United Kingdom – Travellers' Choice Awards
2016, 2017, 2018, 2021: Valhalla - Best Water Ride in the World – Golden Ticket Awards

Ghosts

Pleasure Beach is alleged to be haunted by several ghosts and over the years there have been a number of high-profile paranormal investigations held within its grounds. The most well-known and reported ghost story involves the Ghost Train ride, which is supposedly haunted by the spirit of a former ride operator named "Cloggy". Other stories involve poltergeist activity in both the gift shop under Sir Hiram Maxim's Captive Flying Machine and The Star pub on Ocean Boulevard. The Arena is also said to be the home of a ghostly presence which inhabits the backstage dressing rooms and tractor bay. The park has featured on many paranormal-related TV shows, including Most Haunted and Great British Ghosts and features in many books written on the subject.

Incidents

On 21 July 2000, 11-year-old Christopher Sharrat died after falling from a ride vehicle on the 'Space Invader' roller-coaster. He was reported to have possibly panicked on the dark ride and unfastened his seatbelt. Following an investigation, police were confident that the death was accidental. The ride closed in 2008 and has since relocated to Brean Leisure Park, operating from 2011 as Astro Storm.

On 31 August 2000, 23 people were injured, when two trains collided on The Big One due to a failure with the rides braking system. Twenty-one were taken to hospital.

On 11 August 2009, two trains on The Big Dipper carrying a total of 32 guests collided, resulting in 21 people requiring treatment for injuries ranging from whiplash and broken noses to cut and bruises.

On 14 June 2011, a train on The Big One stopped abruptly, causing a few minor injuries to the occupants. One person was reportedly taken to hospital suffering from whiplash.

On 24 October 2014, 58-year-old Robert Sycamore accompanied his 13-year-old nephew on The Grand National coaster. When the ride returned to the station, Mr Sycamore was found in the bottom of the carriage with neck and back injuries. It is understood he had an underlying back complaint of spondylitis.

In popular culture 

In 1997 the Pleasure Beach was the subject of a 6-part fly-on-the-wall BBC documentary which focused on the daily operation of the park. Each episode featured interviews with park management and dealt with the everyday triumphs and hurdles of running an amusement park.
The Big One is featured in the 2001 film The Parole Officer (with the film's protagonist repeatedly vomiting on the riders behind him) and in one episode of A Touch of Frost.
The music video for Simply Red's 1995 UK #1 hit "Fairground" was shot here, as were the videos for The Killers' "Here With Me" and 5 Seconds of Summer's "Try Hard".
The Infusion rollercoaster featured in the 2009 Specsavers advertising campaign.
In 2002 Most Haunted conducted an investigation at the Pleasure Beach. 
The Laughing Man was briefly portrayed as a psychotic French clown in Jamie H. Scrutton's 2010 short film His Haunted Laughter. The artist performed in the role of the character.
The park was featured in TV drama Waterloo Road. Finn Sharkey (Jack McMullen), Lauren Andrews (Darcy Isa), Sambuca Kelly (Holly Kenny) and Tom Clarkson (Jason Done) visit the park.
Popular ITV soap opera Coronation Street was filmed at the park many times over the years.
In 1988 the children's television programme Blue Peter visited the park. Presenters Mark Curry and Yvette Fielding rode the then newly launched Avalanche coaster and interviewed Doris and Geoffrey Thompson.
Professional wrestler Darren Kenneth Matthews, most commonly known as William Regal, began his wrestling career at the park at aged 15.
Parts of The Harry Hill Movie were filmed at Pleasure Beach.
An advertising campaign for Irn-Bru featuring a group of goths riding the Revolution roller coaster (then sponsored by the brand) was filmed at the park.
British boy band JLS rode on the Big Dipper in early 2012 whilst singing their hit "Everybody in Love", later posted on their official Facebook page.
Kevin Bacon rode the Big One with a young child to advertise EE 4G The advertisement was then aired on national television in May 2014.
The Ghost Train features in Tim Burton's 2016 film Miss Peregrine's Home for Peculiar Children.
The One Show filmed at the park in 2016, for a demonstration on ride dynamics, explaining the shape of the vertical loop on Revolution, and measurements of the G-force pressure accumulated on the Ice Blast ride.
In November 2016 BBC's Strictly Come Dancing featured a segment where contestant Judge Rinder visited the Pleasure Beach and rode the Ice Blast ride.
In 2017, Infusion was featured in Little Boy Blue (TV series) during a scene set in Florida.
In the game Rollercoaster Tycoon this is featured as one of the real parks to use in game alongside Alton Towers added in expansion packs.

Gallery

See also 
Pleasureland Southport
Frontierland, Morecambe
Minirail, a monorail at Expo 67 that shares track and rolling stock with Blackpool, both acquired from the 1964 Swiss National Exhibition.
Alton Towers

References

Further reading

External links

 
1896 establishments in England
Amusement parks in England
Tourist attractions in Blackpool
Blackpool